The stout barsided skink (Concinnia sokosoma)  is a species of skink found in Queensland in Australia.

References

Concinnia
Reptiles described in 1992
Taxa named by Allen Eddy Greer